Constantin Stancu (2 October 1956) is a Romanian retired football player and manager.

Club career
Constantin Stancu spent his entire playing career at Argeș Pitești, making a total of 445 appearances in Divizia A in which he scored one goal. He also made 14 appearances in European Cups. Stancu won the Divizia A in the 1978–79 season, contributing with one goal scored in 34 appearances.

International career
Constantin Stancu made three appearances at international level for Romania, making his debut on 1 June 1983 when coach Mircea Lucescu sent him on the field to replace Gino Iorgulescu in the 70th minute of a friendly which ended with a 1–0 loss against Yugoslavia. His following two games were also friendlies, a 2–2 against Poland and a 2–0 victory against Greece.

Honours
Argeș Pitești
Divizia A: 1978–79

References

External links
 
 
 
 Constantin Stancu at Labtof.ro 

1956 births
Living people
Sportspeople from Pitești
Romanian footballers
Association football central defenders
Association football midfielders
Romania international footballers
Romania under-21 international footballers
Olympic footballers of Romania
FC Argeș Pitești players
Liga I players
Romanian football managers
FC Argeș Pitești managers
FCM Târgoviște managers
FC Astra Giurgiu managers
CS Mioveni managers
ASC Daco-Getica București managers